Myo Thein Gyi (born 2 September 1965) is the former Minister for Education of Myanmar. He previously served as Professor of Mathematics Department, Dagon University, Director General of Department of Myanmar Education Research and Rector of West Yangon University. He became Minister of Education after Aung San Suu Kyi on 6 April 2016. During the 2021 Myanmar coup d'état on 1 February, Myo Thein Gyi was placed under house arrest by the Myanmar Armed Forces.

Degrees 
He received M.Sc (Mathematics) from University of Yangon in 1992, Dr.rer.nat. (Mathematics) from Technical University of Berlin, Germany in 1998. He also received Diploma in Education Management from Yangon University of Economics in 2002.

Career life

References 

Government ministers of Myanmar
Education ministers
1965 births
Living people
People from Yangon
University of Yangon alumni
Technical University of Berlin alumni
Education ministers of Myanmar